Odontopaschia virescens is a species of snout moth in the genus Odontopaschia. It was described by George Hampson in 1903. It is found in northern India.

References

Moths described in 1903
Epipaschiinae